The Gulf of Salerno (Italian: Golfo di Salerno) is a gulf of the Tyrrhenian Sea in the coast of the province of Salerno in south-western Italy.

The northern part of this coast is the Costiera Amalfitana, which ends at Punta di Campanella and includes towns like Amalfi, Maiori, Positano and the city of Salerno itself. The gulf also borders Piana del Sele to the east and the Cilento coast, which ends at Punta Licosa, to the south. The distance from Punta Licosa to Punta Campanella is approximately 61 km (38 miles). The surface of the gulf, delimited by the imaginary line that connects Punta Licosa to Punta Campanella and by the coast, is approximately 2,450 km2.

The Gulf of Salerno is separated from the Gulf of Naples (on the north) by the Sorrentine Peninsula. In the north, the gulf coast, also called the Divina Costiera due to its beauty, is rugged by the rocky slopes of the Lattari Mountains falling into the sea. To the east, the coastline of the Sele plain is low and sandy and partly covered by pine forests.

References
 

Salerno
Salerno
Landforms of the Tyrrhenian Sea
Landforms of Campania
Province of Salerno
Cilento
Salerno